Lake Wister is a reservoir in Le Flore County, in southeast Oklahoma. The lake is created by the Poteau River and the Fourche Maline creek. Wister Lake was authorized for flood control and conservation by the Flood Control Act of 1938. The project was designed and built by the Tulsa District Corps of Engineers. Construction began in April 1946, and the project was placed in full flood control operation in December 1949.

History
Lake Wister was authorized for flood control and conservation by the Flood Control Act of 1938. The project was designed and built by the Tulsa District Corps of Engineers at a cost of $10.5 million. Construction began in April 1946, and the project was placed in full flood control operation December 1949. It is now part of Lake Wister State Park. The lake is named for the nearby city of Wister, Oklahoma. Other nearby cities are Heavener and Poteau.

The area around the lake has been inhabited for thousands of years. There are numerous mounds in the area that were created by prehistoric Native Americans.  During territorial times the area was located in Sugar Loaf County, one of the counties making up the Moshulatubbee District in the Choctaw Nation.

Description
The normal elevation is 478 feet, minimum elevation is 450 feet and the maximum is 503 feet. Design volume of water is 61423 acre-ft. It drains an area of 993 square miles.

References

External links
U.S. Army Corps of Engineers: Wister Lake
U.S. Army Corps of Engineers: Corps Lake Gateway
U.S. Army Corps of Engineers: lake level
Lake Wister State Park
 Oklahoma Digital Maps: Digital Collections of Oklahoma and Indian Territory
Oklahoma Department of Wildlife Conservation. Wister Wildlife Management Area.

Protected areas of Le Flore County, Oklahoma
Wister
Dams in Oklahoma
United States Army Corps of Engineers dams
Bodies of water of Le Flore County, Oklahoma
Dams completed in 1949
1949 establishments in Oklahoma